Mashrakh is a Block and town of Saran District in the western part of Bihar, India. It is located on the right bank of Ghoghari river. It is situated at 40 km from Chhapra and 98 km from state capital Patna. There are 17 Panchayats in Mashrakh Block.

Mashrakh is connected by train between Chhapra, Siwan, Gopalganj and Patna by road, which is connected to Chapra, Gopalganj & Siwan. Mashrakh is now urban area as Nagar Panchayat. Mashrakh used to be a well-known business hub in Saran commissionary. The town has a government hospital, private and government banks, veterinary hospital, police station, head post office, T.V. transmission center, and a telecommunication technical hub. There are two Inter & Degree colleges in the block - Mashrak College, Mashrak and Bahadurpur College, Bahadurpur, Mashrak Degree College, Mashrakh.
Bhojpuri/Hindi is used as a widely spoken language.

Villages
Some of the villages are Benchapra, Mashrak ramghat (Mashrakh West Tola), Mashrakh Takth, Mashrakh Shastri Tola (Mashrakh Yadu More), Pakri, Bahadurpur, Kawalpura, Gopalbadi, Galimapur, Gangauli, Dhanauti, Sonouli, Semari, Godhna, Chainpur, Charihara, Deoriya, Mashrakh West Tola (Nayaka Tola), Rasauli, Ganauli, Durgauly, Jajauli, Dum Duma, Bahrauly, Baluan, Chhapia, Fenahara, Sapahi, Barwaghat, Arna, Chandbarwan Bansohi, Chakiya, Khajuri, Ghoghiya, Nawada, Bahuara Serukahn Pachkhanda, Khairanpur, Chand Kudariya, Bisnupura, Hanumanganj (Mashrakh East), Satar Ghat.

Alphabetical list of premier institutions 
 Aashram School, Mashrakh
 Al Shaheen Paramedical College & Hospital, Mashrakh
 Bahadurpur College, Bahdurpur
 Central School, Mashrakh
 Ganauli school, Ganauli
 Gangauli school, Gangauli
 High school, Mashrakh.
 High School, Satjora
 Jagarnath janki girls high school, Mashrakh. Kendriya Vidyalaya, Mashrakh
 Janta High School, Godhana 
 Krishana Bahadur High School, Harpurajan 
 Lokmanya High School, Kudariya Rajapati 
 Mashrak Degree College, Mashrakh
 Mahant Ram Swaroop Das High School, Bahuara (Math)
 Middle School Chainpur Charihara
 Mahant Ram Prayag Das High School, Khairanpur (Math)
 Mashrak College, Mashrakh
 Nageshwar High school & Govt. Inter College Bahadurpur
 Primary School Arana, Uttar Tola
 Pragatishil Yuva Kendra (Frmr: Nehru Yuva Mandal), Bahadurpur
 Rajkiya madhya vidyalaya (Board middle school), Mashrakh
 Ram Ekbal Singh college (Degree college) Bahadurpur 
 Ramdev Middle school, Mashrakh.
 Rajkiya kanya vidyalaya (Durgaluly)
 Rajkiya Prathamik Vidyalaya (Siyarbhukka)* Tarun Bharat(NGO) Bahadurpur
 Sri Awadh High School, Chainpur Charihara

Food poisoning
On 16 July 2013, in Dharmasati-Mata primary school, at Gandaman village (7.3 km west of Mashrakh), 23 children were poisoned to death after eating free lunch provided by the school, that had been contaminated with insecticide.

References

Saran district